Beach volleyball was one of the many sports which was held at the 2002 Asian Games in Busan, South Korea.

Schedule

Medalists

Medal table

Participating nations
A total of 58 athletes from 11 nations competed in beach volleyball at the 2002 Asian Games:

Final standing

Men

Women

References

2002 Asian Games Report, Pages 746

External links
Official website

 
2002 Asian Games events
Asian Games
2002